Miss Earth Singapore is an annual beauty pageant in Singapore. The winner of Miss Earth Singapore obtains the right to represent the country in the Miss Earth pageant.

History
Miss Earth Singapore, which is a beauty pageant with a cause and responsibility, is driven to enhance awareness and sustainable development on the environmental crisis and challenges. Every year, 4 winners are crowned as representative elements: Earth, Air, Water and Fire to promote environmental awareness. The winner of the earth element represents as Miss Earth Singapore to compete in the international platform. Other subsidiary awards include Best in swimsuit, Miss Photogenic and Miss Friendship.

Miss Earth Singapore is part of an annual global search for Miss Earth which gathers delegates from over 90 countries all around the world to promote worthwhile environmental causes and active involvement in caring for and preserving the earth. The Miss Earth Singapore campaign incorporates environmental and corporate social responsibility (CSR) activities.

Titleholders

Singapore representatives at Miss Earth 
Color keys
The winner of Miss Singapore competes at the Miss Earth pageant. On occasions, when the winner does not qualify to compete, another winner may selected.

See also
Mister Singapore
Miss Singapore Universe
Miss Singapore World
Miss Singapore International

References

External links 
 

Singapore
Beauty pageants in Singapore
Recurring events established in 2001
Singaporean awards